Capps Creek Township is one of twenty-five townships in Barry County, Missouri, United States. As of the 2000 census, its population was 570.

Capps Creek Township was established in 1845, taking its name from Capps Creek.

Geography

The streams of Hudson Creek, South Fork Capps Creek and Zerbert Branch run through this township.

Jolly Bethel Church and Cemetery and Sts. Peter and Paul Catholic Church and Cemitery are located in the township.

Transportation
Capps Creek Township contains one airport or landing strip, Monett Municipal Airport.

References

 USGS Geographic Names Information System (GNIS)

External links
 US-Counties.com
 City-Data.com

Townships in Barry County, Missouri
Townships in Missouri